Embree refers to an area in Garland, Texas, United States that once was its own city in northeastern Dallas County.

In 1891 Embree disincorporated and on March 31 of that year Garland took the former area of Embree in its city.

External links 
 

Former cities in Texas
Geography of Garland, Texas